Chris Williams is a British journalist.

A former editor of the Daily Express, he is currently editor of the Scottish Daily Mail.

References

Living people
British male journalists
Place of birth missing (living people)
1950s births
Daily Express people